Straight A's is a 2013 American romantic comedy film directed by James Cox, produced by Jamie Adamic, and starring Anna Paquin, Ryan Phillippe and Luke Wilson. The film was released on January 13, 2013, in Brazil, on March 19, 2013, in the United States and on June 5, 2013, in the Netherlands. It was distributed by Millennium Entertainment.

Plot 
Scott is a man who has been in and out of rehabilitation for eight years and is haunted by the ghost of his dead mother pressing him to return home to Louisiana to the family he turned his back on years ago. Arriving on horseback without warning, he immediately meets his niece and nephew, Gracie Anne and Charles.

As the kids tell him about their frog that passed, Scott comes face to face with Katherine, his brother's wife and his first love. She's at first shocked, then openly hostile. He insists that his dead mother sent him to make amends. 

Falling asleep in the tub prompts Katherine's anger again, she asks him to leave and come back on Thursday when William is back. After Gracie Anne helps clean up his appearance, Scott goes to Charles' school at lunch and helps him get a girl to notice him. 

Later that day, Katherine chews Scott out yet again as the principal called, exaggerating Scott's visit as being more disruptive than it was. That evening, by the pool, they share a joint, and he tells her she was right to not have left with him to Texas years ago. He was run off by his father. 

The second time he visits his father George, who runs him off with a gun again, still doesn't recognize him. His Alzheimer's has blocked Scott from his memory. Afterwards, he asked Carlos the gardener to take him to a bar, so he misses another meal.

Late that night, Scott returns with a group of hispanics he met at the bar, and they jump into the pool. When they wake her, Katherine runs them out of the pool and Scott out of the house.

When Charles doesn't find Scott in the house, he fears he'll miss his school presentation. Upon their arrival at school, they see he got there earlier. Charles uses the technique Scott taught him for public speaking and it proves very effective. 

Arriving home, William is back and he also doesn't look happy to see Scott. Katherine has organised a family lunch, so George comes, and whacks Scott upon seeing him. Once seated, George's carer gives him part of his wife's journal to read. She calls on the family to make amends to each other.

Scott asks to be excused, stumbles into the bathroom and collapses. In the hospital, the doctor explains he's in stage 3 of brain cancer, making it clear why he was consuming so much Vicodin and marijuana. In his coma-like state, the family took turns at his side. Another journal excerpt about both of her sons being in love with Katherine she reads to Scott. It also reveals that Charles was fathered just before he had left town, but noone noticed as there was a short gap between her dating him and William. 

Charles' eulogy for Scott on Monday, less than a week after meeting him, is in three parts as Scott taught him, 'He was a fire-bellied toad who took a chance and became a prince for a day.'

Cast 
Anna Paquin as Katherine
Ryan Phillippe as Scott
Luke Wilson as William
Powers Boothe as Father		
Riley Thomas Stewart as Charles
Ursula Parker as Gracie
Tess Harper as Mother 
Amparo Garcia-Crow as Louisa
Josh Meyers as Jason
Christa Campbell as Dana	
Whitney Able as Lizzy
Liz Mikel as Nurse Viola

References

External links
 
 

2013 films
American romantic comedy films
2013 romantic comedy films
Films directed by James Cox
2010s English-language films
2010s American films